

Development
AMDgpu is AMD's fully open source unified kernel driver for its GPUs on Linux.
It takes the form of an in-tree kernel module.

As of 2022, AMD Kernel Fusion Driver (KFD) is now integrated in this one kernel module. AMD KFD development at AMD is part of ROCm, under the ROCk project.

Distribution
AMDgpu has been fully upstreamed and new developments continue to do so.

As AMDgpu is part of the monolithic Linux kernel, it is shipped by most Linux distributions directly. The package suite / install script amdgpu-pro, distributed by AMD directly from AMD Radeon Software, ships an AMDgpu kernel module somewhat reliably more up-to-date compared to that of kernels shipped in regular operating system distributions.

Community
The development of the kernel module happens between AMD and the Linux maintainers, discussions happen on the freedesktop.org mailing lists - freedesktop being home to major Linux graphics projects such as Mesa, libdrm, Xorg, Wayland.

Support
AMDgpu officially supports cards built upon GCN 1.2 or higher, including new instruction sets such as RDNA1&2, CDNA.

Support issues
Though  support for GCN 1.0/1.1 is incomplete, it can be enabled by a kernel parameter and some Linux distributions enabled it by default.

See also
 Radeon — AMD's main GPU brand
 AMD Radeon Software — AMD's default software distribution channel
 Free and open-source graphics device driver

References

External links 
 

AMD software
Linux drivers
Free device drivers